Tyler Joseph Mitchem (born May 24, 1998) is an American indoor volleyball player plays as a middle blocker on the United States men's national volleyball team. On club level, he plays for Le Plessis-Robinson Volley-ball in France.

Personal life

Mitchem is a native of Bolingbrook, Illinois and is a high school graduate of Bolingbrook High School. His mother, Jackie, played basketball at Lewis, and his father James played basketball at DePaul, helping the team reach the 1979 NCAA Final Four.

Career

Lewis
Mitchem played for the Lewis Flyers volleyball team from 2017–2022. After redshirting his freshman season in 2017, he played for 4 seasons over 5 years, as he used his extra year of eligibility granted by the NCAA during the COVID-19 pandemic (the 2020 season was cancelled due to the pandemic). He was named an AVCA All-American second team in 2019 and was a first team selection his 3 final seasons. In 2019, Mitchem led the NCAA in hitting percentage with a .504% and helped Lewis to the 2019 Division I/II NCAA Final Four, where they lost to Hawai'i in the semifinals.

In 2021, he helped Lewis to the 2021 Division I/II NCAA Final Four and was named to the All-Tournament Team, after recording 10 kills and 6 blocks in Lewis' semifinal loss versus BYU.

In 2022, he tallied a .447 Hitting %, and had 122 Blocks, averaging 1.341 blocks per set. He also garnered multiple other awards in 2022 from Off The Block, including the National Blocker of the Year, the Dain Blanton Diversity Award winner, the Division II National Player of the Year and the Ryan Millar award. Mitchem's 1.34 blocks per set was 3rd in the nation between Division I/II players.

Professional clubs

  Le Plessis-Robinson Volley-ball (fr) (2022–)

On June 4, 2022, Mitchem announced on his Instagram account that he would play his first professional season in France for the 2022–2023 season, with Le Plessis-Robinson club.

National team

Mitchem made his U.S. national team debut in 2021. He participated in the 2021 Men's Pan-American Volleyball Cup and won a bronze medal with the team.

In the 2022 FIVB Nations League, Mitchem played in matches versus the Netherlands, Brazil, and Iran, recording 16 total points throughout all matches. He was named to the final roster and though did not see any playing team in the finals week matches, won a silver medal with the team.

Honors and awards

International

2022 Nations League –  Silver medal, with U.S. national team
2021 Pan-American Cup –  Bronze medal, with U.S. national team

See also
2021 Lewis Flyers men's volleyball team
2022 Lewis Flyers men's volleyball team

External links
Team USA Bio

References

1998 births
Living people
Sportspeople from Illinois
American men's volleyball players
Lewis Flyers men's volleyball players
American expatriate sportspeople in France
Expatriate volleyball players in France
Lewis University alumni